Packsaddle,  New South Wales is a remote township and civil parish of Evelyn County, New South Wales within the Far West Region. Its population is 87.

The parish was calculate at 318500 acres.

The settlement is located where the Silver City Highway crosses the Packsaddle Creek.

The name is said by some to have been given by Burke and Wills who lost a packsaddle crossing the creek upstream from the modern hamlet.

The area was owned by Goldborough Mort and Co in the 1890s, and Kidman in the 1920s.

A gymkhana is held at Easter time.

The parish has a Köppen climate classification of BWh (Hot desert).

References

Unincorporated Far West Region
Parishes of Evelyn County
Towns in New South Wales